Grand Lagoon is a  freshwater lagoon of elevation  on Bulgarian Beach, Hurd Peninsula in eastern Livingston Island, in the South Shetland Islands, Antarctica. Formed by Rezovski Creek and separated from sea by a moraine of elevation near . Surmounted by Pesyakov Hill. On the northeast side of the lagoon is the helipad of the Bulgarian base, and on its southwest side — the designated embarkation area and a shed hosting the base's Zodiac inflatable boats. A descriptive name, established in use at the time of approval.

Location
Bulgarian mapping from a ground survey accomplished during the austral summer of 1995–96.

Maps
 L.L. Ivanov. St. Kliment Ohridski Base, Livingston Island. Scale 1:1000 topographic map. Sofia: Antarctic Place-names Commission of Bulgaria, 1996. (The first Bulgarian Antarctic topographic map, in Bulgarian)
 L.L. Ivanov. Livingston Island: Central-Eastern Region. Scale 1:25000 topographic map.  Sofia: Antarctic Place-names Commission of Bulgaria, 1996.
 L.L. Ivanov. Antarctica: Livingston Island and Greenwich, Robert, Snow and Smith Islands. Scale 1:120000 topographic map.  Troyan: Manfred Wörner Foundation, 2009.
 Antarctica, South Shetland Islands, Livingston Island: Bulgarian Antarctic Base. Sheets 1 and 2. Scale 1:2000 topographic map. Geodesy, Cartography and Cadastre Agency, 2016. (in Bulgarian)
 L.L. Ivanov. Antarctica: Livingston Island and Smith Island. Scale 1:100000 topographic map. Manfred Wörner Foundation, 2017.

References
 Grand Lagoon. SCAR Composite Antarctic Gazetteer
 Bulgarian Antarctic Gazetteer. Antarctic Place-names Commission. (details in Bulgarian, basic data in English)

Bodies of water of Livingston Island
Lakes of the South Shetland Islands